Thomas Ruggles Pynchon Jr. (born May 8, 1937) is an American novelist noted for his dense and complex novels. His fiction and non-fiction writings encompass a vast array of subject matter, genres and themes, including history, music, science, and mathematics. For Gravity's Rainbow, Pynchon won the 1973 U.S. National Book Award for Fiction.

Hailing from Long Island, Pynchon served two years in the United States Navy and earned an English degree from Cornell University. After publishing several short stories in the late 1950s and early 1960s, he began composing the novels for which he is best known: V. (1963), The Crying of Lot 49 (1966), and Gravity's Rainbow (1973). His 2009 novel Inherent Vice was adapted into a feature film of the same name by director Paul Thomas Anderson in 2014. Pynchon is notoriously reclusive from the media; few photographs of him have been published, and rumors about his location and identity have circulated since the 1960s, although he voiced himself in two episodes of The Simpsons. Pynchon's most recent novel, Bleeding Edge, was published on September 17, 2013.

Early life

Thomas Pynchon was born on May 8, 1937, in Glen Cove, Long Island, New York, one of three children of engineer and politician Thomas Ruggles Pynchon Sr. (1907–1995) and Katherine Frances Bennett (1909–1996), a nurse. His earliest American ancestor, William Pynchon, emigrated to the Massachusetts Bay Colony with the Winthrop Fleet in 1630, then became the founder of Springfield, Massachusetts, in 1636, and thereafter a long line of Pynchon descendants found wealth and repute on American soil. Aspects of Pynchon's ancestry and family background have partially inspired his fiction writing, particularly in the Slothrop family histories related in the short story "The Secret Integration" (1964) and Gravity's Rainbow (1973). During his childhood, Pynchon alternately attended Episcopal services with his father and Roman Catholic services with his mother.

Education and military career
A "voracious reader and precocious writer", Pynchon is believed to have skipped two grades before high school. Pynchon attended Oyster Bay High School in Oyster Bay, where he was awarded "student of the year" and contributed short fictional pieces to his school newspaper. These juvenilia incorporated some of the literary motifs and recurring subject matter he would use throughout his career: oddball names, sophomoric humor, illicit drug use, and paranoia.

Pynchon graduated from high school in 1953 at the age of 16. That fall, he went to Cornell University to study engineering physics. At the end of his sophomore year, he enlisted to serve in the U.S. Navy. He attended boot camp at United States Naval Training Center Bainbridge, Maryland, then received training to be an electrician at a base in Norfolk, Virginia. In 1956, he was aboard the destroyer USS Hank in the Mediterranean during the Suez Crisis. According to recollections from his Navy friends, Pynchon said at the time that he did not intend to complete his college education.

In 1957, he returned to Cornell to pursue a degree in English. His first published story, "The Small Rain", appeared in the Cornell Writer in March 1959, and narrates an actual experience of a friend who had served in the Army; subsequently, however, episodes and characters throughout Pynchon's fiction draw freely upon his own experiences in the Navy. His short story, "Mortality and Mercy in Vienna", was published in the Spring 1959 issue of Epoch.

While at Cornell, Pynchon started his friendships with Richard Fariña, Kirkpatrick Sale, and David Shetzline. Pynchon would go on to dedicate Gravity's Rainbow to Fariña, as well as serve as his best man and as his pallbearer. Together the two briefly led what Pynchon has called a "micro-cult" devoted to Oakley Hall's 1958 novel Warlock. Pynchon later reminisced about his college days in the introduction he wrote in 1983 for Fariña's novel Been Down So Long It Looks Like Up to Me, first published in 1966. He reportedly attended lectures given by Vladimir Nabokov, who then taught literature at Cornell. Although Nabokov later said that he had no memory of Pynchon, Nabokov's wife Véra, who graded her husband's class papers, commented that she remembered his distinctive handwriting as a mixture of printed and cursive letters, "half printing, half script." In 1958, Pynchon and Sale wrote part or all of a science-fiction musical, Minstrel Island, which portrayed a dystopian future in which IBM rules the world. Pynchon received his B.A. with distinction as a member of Phi Beta Kappa in June 1959.

Career

Early career

V.

After leaving Cornell, Pynchon began to work on his first novel: V. From February 1960 to September 1962, he was employed as a technical writer at Boeing in Seattle, where he compiled safety articles for the Bomarc Service News, a support newsletter for the BOMARC surface-to-air missile deployed by the U.S. Air Force. Pynchon's experiences at Boeing inspired his depictions of the "Yoyodyne" corporation in V. and The Crying of Lot 49, and both his background in physics and the technical journalism he undertook at Boeing provided much raw material for Gravity's Rainbow. When published in 1963, V. won a William Faulkner Foundation Award for the best first novel of the year. (It was a finalist for the National Book Award.)

After resigning from Boeing, Pynchon spent some time in New York and Mexico before moving to California, where he was reportedly based for much of the 1960s and early 1970s, most notably in an apartment in Manhattan Beach, as he was composing what would become the highly regarded Gravity's Rainbow.

A negative aspect that Pynchon retrospectively found in the hippie cultural and literary movement, both in the form of the Beats of the 1950s and the resurgence form of the 1960s, was that it "placed too much emphasis on youth, including the eternal variety."

In 1964, his application to study mathematics as a graduate student at the University of California, Berkeley was turned down. In 1966, Pynchon wrote a first-hand report on the aftermath and legacy of the Watts Riots in Los Angeles. Titled "A Journey Into the Mind of Watts", the article was published in The New York Times Magazine.

From the mid-1960s Pynchon has also regularly provided blurbs and introductions for a wide range of novels and non-fiction works. One of the first of these pieces was a brief review of Oakley Hall's Warlock which appeared, along with comments by seven other writers on "neglected books", as part of a feature titled "A Gift of Books" in the December 1965 issue of Holiday.

In 1968, Pynchon was one of 447 signatories to the "Writers and Editors War Tax Protest". Full-page advertisements in the New York Post and The New York Review of Books listed the names of those who had pledged not to pay "the proposed 10% income tax surcharge or any war-designated tax increase", and stated their belief "that American involvement in Vietnam is morally wrong".

The Crying of Lot 49

In an April 1964 letter to his agent, Candida Donadio, Pynchon wrote that he was facing a creative crisis, with four novels in progress, announcing: "If they come out on paper anything like they are inside my head then it will be the literary event of the millennium."

In the mid-1960s, Pynchon lived at 217 33rd St. in Manhattan Beach, California, in a small downstairs apartment.

In December 1965, Pynchon politely turned down an invitation from Stanley Edgar Hyman to teach literature at Bennington College, writing that he had resolved, two or three years earlier, to write three novels at once. Pynchon described the decision as "a moment of temporary insanity", but noted that he was "too stubborn to let any of them go, let alone all of them."

Pynchon's second novel, The Crying of Lot 49, was published a few months later in 1966. Whether it was one of the three or four novels Pynchon had in progress is not known, but in a 1965 letter to Donadio, Pynchon had written that he was in the middle of writing a "potboiler". When the book grew to 155 pages, he called it, "a short story, but with gland trouble", and hoped that Donadio could "unload it on some poor sucker."

The Crying of Lot 49 won the Richard and Hinda Rosenthal Foundation Award shortly after publication. Although more concise and linear in its structure than Pynchon's other novels, its labyrinthine plot features an ancient, underground mail service known as "The Tristero" or "Trystero", a parody of a Jacobean revenge drama called The Courier's Tragedy, and a corporate conspiracy involving the bones of World War II American GIs being used as charcoal cigarette filters. It proposes a series of seemingly incredible interconnections between these events and other similarly bizarre revelations that confront the novel's protagonist, Oedipa Maas. Like V., the novel contains a wealth of references to science and technology and to obscure historical events, with both books dwelling on the detritus of American society and culture. The Crying of Lot 49 also continues Pynchon's strategy of composing parodic song lyrics and punning names, and referencing aspects of popular culture within his prose narratives. In particular, it incorporates an allusion to the protagonist of Nabokov's Lolita within the lyric of a love lament sung by a member of "The Paranoids", an American teenage band who deliberately sing their songs with British accents (p. 17).

Gravity's Rainbow

Pynchon's most celebrated novel is his third, Gravity's Rainbow, published in 1973. An intricate and allusive fiction that combines and elaborates on many of the themes of his earlier work, including preterition, paranoia, racism, colonialism, conspiracy, synchronicity, and entropy, there is a wealth of commentary and critical material, including reader's guides, books and scholarly articles, online concordances and discussions, and art works. Its artistic value is often compared to that of James Joyce's Ulysses. Some scholars have hailed it as the greatest American post-WW2 novel, and it has similarly been described as "literally an anthology of postmodernist themes and devices".

The major portion of Gravity's Rainbow takes place in London and Europe in the final months of World War II and the weeks immediately following VE Day, and is narrated for the most part from within the historical moment in which it is set. In this way, Pynchon's text enacts a type of dramatic irony whereby neither the characters nor the various narrative voices are aware of specific historical circumstances, such as the Holocaust and, except as hints, premonitions and mythography, the complicity between Western corporate interests and the Nazi war machine, which figure prominently in readers' apprehensions of the novel's historical context. For example, at war's end the narrator observes:  "There are rumors of a War Crimes Tribunal under way in Nürnberg. No one Slothrop has listened to is clear who's trying whom for what ... " (p. 681) Such an approach generates dynamic tension and moments of acute self-consciousness, as both reader and author seem drawn ever deeper into the "plot", in various senses of that term:

The novel invokes anti-authority sentiments, often through violations of narrative conventions and integrity. For example, as the protagonist, Tyrone Slothrop, considers the fact that his own family "made its money killing trees", he apostrophizes his apology and plea for advice to the coppice within which he has momentarily taken refuge. In an overt incitement to eco-activism, Pynchon's narrative agency then has it that "a medium-sized pine nearby nods its top and suggests, 'Next time you come across a logging operation out here, find one of their tractors that isn't being guarded, and take its oil filter with you. That's what you can do.'" (p. 553)

Encyclopedic in scope and often self-conscious in style, the novel displays erudition in its treatment of an array of material drawn from the fields of psychology, chemistry, mathematics, history, religion, music, literature, human sexuality, and film. Pynchon wrote the first draft of Gravity's Rainbow in "neat, tiny script on engineer's quadrille paper". Pynchon worked on the novel throughout the 1960s and early 1970s while he was living in California and Mexico City.

Gravity's Rainbow shared the 1974 National Book Award with A Crown of Feathers and Other Stories by Isaac Bashevis Singer (split award). That same year, the Pulitzer Prize fiction panel unanimously recommended Gravity's Rainbow for the award, but the Pulitzer board vetoed the jury's recommendation, describing the novel as "unreadable", "turgid", "overwritten", and in parts "obscene". (No Pulitzer Prize for Fiction was awarded and finalists were not recognized before 1980.) In 1975, Pynchon declined the William Dean Howells Medal.

Later career

A collection of Pynchon's early short stories, Slow Learner, was published in 1984, with a lengthy autobiographical introduction. In October of the same year, an article titled "Is It O.K. to Be a Luddite?" was published in The New York Times Book Review. In April 1988, Pynchon contributed an extensive review of Gabriel García Márquez's novel Love in the Time of Cholera to The New York Times, under the title "The Heart's Eternal Vow". Another article, titled "Nearer, My Couch, to Thee", was published in June 1993 in The New York Times Book Review, as one in a series of articles in which various writers reflected on each of the Seven Deadly Sins. Pynchon's subject was "Sloth".

Vineland

Pynchon's fourth novel, Vineland, was published in 1990, but disappointed some fans and critics. It did, however, receive a positive review from the novelist Salman Rushdie, who called it "free-flowing and light and funny and maybe the most readily accessible piece of writing the old Invisible Man ever came up with." The novel is set in California in the 1980s and 1960s and describes the relationship between an FBI COINTELPRO agent and a female radical filmmaker. Its strong socio-political undercurrents detail the constant battle between authoritarianism and communalism, and the nexus between resistance and complicity, but with a typically Pynchonian sense of humor.

In 1988, he received a MacArthur Fellowship and, since the early 1990s at least, he has been frequently cited as a contender for the Nobel Prize in Literature.

Mason & Dixon

The meticulously researched novel is a sprawling postmodernist saga recounting the lives and careers of the English astronomer Charles Mason and his partner, the surveyor Jeremiah Dixon, the surveyors of the Mason–Dixon line, during the birth of the American Republic. Some commentators acknowledged it as a welcome return to form; T. C. Boyle called it "the old Pynchon, the true Pynchon, the best Pynchon of all" and "a book of heart and fire and genius", praising Mason and Dixon as Pynchon's most complete characters. The American critic Harold Bloom hailed the novel as Pynchon's "masterpiece to date". Bloom named Pynchon as one of the four major American novelists of his time, along with Don DeLillo, Philip Roth, and Cormac McCarthy.

Against the Day

A variety of rumors pertaining to the subject matter of Against the Day circulated for a number of years. Most specific of these were comments made by the former German minister of culture Michael Naumann, who stated that he assisted Pynchon in his research about "a Russian mathematician [who] studied for David Hilbert in Göttingen", and that the new novel would trace the life and loves of Sofia Kovalevskaya.

In July 2006, a new, untitled novel by Pynchon was announced along with a synopsis written by Pynchon himself, which appeared on Amazon.com; it stated that the novel's action takes place between the 1893 Chicago World's Fair and the time immediately following World War I. "With a worldwide disaster looming just a few years ahead", Pynchon wrote in his book description, "it is a time of unrestrained corporate greed, false religiosity, moronic fecklessness, and evil intent in high places. No reference to the present day is intended or should be inferred." He promised cameos by Nikola Tesla, Bela Lugosi and Groucho Marx, as well as "stupid songs" and "strange sexual practices". Subsequently, the title of the new book was reported to be Against the Day and a Penguin spokesperson confirmed that the synopsis was Pynchon's.

Against the Day was released on November 21, 2006, and is 1,085 pages long in the first edition hardcover. The book was given almost no promotion by Penguin and professional book reviewers were given little time in advance to review the book. An edited version of Pynchon's synopsis was used as the jacket-flap copy and Kovalevskaya does appear, although as only one of over a hundred characters.

Composed in part of a series of interwoven pastiches of popular fiction genres from the era in which it is set, the novel inspired mixed reactions from critics and reviewers. One reviewer remarked, "It is brilliant, but it is exhaustingly brilliant." Other reviewers described Against the Day as "lengthy and rambling" and "a baggy monster of a book", while negative appraisals condemned the novel for its "silliness" or characterized its action as "fairly pointless" and remained unimpressed by its "grab bag of themes".

Inherent Vice

Inherent Vice was published in August 2009.

A synopsis and brief extract from the novel, along with the novel's title, Inherent Vice, and dust jacket image, were printed in Penguin Press' Summer 2009 catalogue. The book was advertised by the publisher as "part-noir, part-psychedelic romp, all Thomas Pynchon—private eye Doc Sportello comes, occasionally, out of a cannabis haze to watch the end of an era as free love slips away and paranoia creeps in with the L.A. fog."

A promotional video for the novel was released by Penguin Books on August 4, 2009, with the character voiceover narrated by the author himself.

A 2014 film adaptation of the same name was directed by Paul Thomas Anderson.

Bleeding Edge

Bleeding Edge takes place in Manhattan's Silicon Alley during "the lull between the collapse of the dot-com boom and the terrible events of September 11."  The novel was published on September 17, 2013, to positive reviews.

Style
Poet L. E. Sissman wrote from The New Yorker: "He is almost a mathematician of prose, who calculates the least and the greatest stress each word and line, each pun and ambiguity, can bear, and applies his knowledge accordingly and virtually without lapses, though he takes many scary, bracing linguistic risks. Thus his remarkably supple diction can first treat of a painful and delicate love scene and then roar, without pause, into the sounds and echoes of a drugged and drunken orgy." Pynchon's style is commonly classified as postmodernist.

Themes
Pynchon's work explores philosophical, theological, and sociological ideas exhaustively, though in quirky and approachable ways. His writings demonstrate a strong affinity with the practitioners and artifacts of low culture, including comic books and cartoons, pulp fiction, popular films, television programs, cookery, urban myths, paranoia and conspiracy theories, and folk art. This blurring of the conventional boundary between "high" and "low" culture has been seen as one of the defining characteristics of his writing.

In particular, Pynchon has revealed himself in his fiction and non-fiction as an aficionado of popular music. Song lyrics and mock musical numbers appear in each of his novels, and, in his autobiographical introduction to the Slow Learner collection of early stories, he reveals a fondness for both jazz and rock and roll. The character McClintic Sphere in V. is a fictional composite of jazz musicians such as Ornette Coleman, Charlie Parker and Thelonious Monk. In The Crying of Lot 49, the lead singer of The Paranoids sports "a Beatle haircut" and sings with an English accent. In the closing pages of Gravity's Rainbow, there is an apocryphal report that Tyrone Slothrop, the novel's protagonist, played kazoo and harmonica as a guest musician on a record released by The Fool in the 1960s (having magically recovered the latter instrument, his "harp", in a German stream in 1945, after losing it down the toilet in 1939 at the Roseland Ballroom in Roxbury, Boston, to the strains of the jazz standard "Cherokee", upon which tune Charlie Parker was simultaneously inventing bebop in New York, as Pynchon describes). In Vineland, both Zoyd Wheeler and Isaiah Two Four are also musicians: Zoyd played keyboards in a '60s surf band called The Corvairs, while Isaiah played in a punk band called Billy Barf and the Vomitones. In Mason & Dixon, one of the characters plays on the "Clavier" the varsity drinking song that will later become "The Star-Spangled Banner"; while in another episode a character remarks tangentially "Sometimes, it's hard to be a woman".

In his introduction to Slow Learner, Pynchon acknowledges a debt to the anarchic bandleader Spike Jones, and in 1994, he penned a 3000-word set of liner notes for the album Spiked!, a collection of Jones's recordings released on the short-lived BMG Catalyst label. Pynchon also wrote the liner notes for Nobody's Cool, the second album of indie rock band Lotion, in which he states that "rock and roll remains one of the last honorable callings, and a working band is a miracle of everyday life. Which is basically what these guys do". He is also known to be a fan of Roky Erickson.

Investigations and digressions into the realms of human sexuality, psychology, sociology, mathematics, science, and technology recur throughout Pynchon's works. One of his earliest short stories, "Low-lands" (1960), features a meditation on Heisenberg's uncertainty principle as a metaphor for telling stories about one's own experiences. His next published work, "Entropy" (1960), introduced the concept which was to become synonymous with Pynchon's name (though Pynchon later admitted the "shallowness of [his] understanding" of the subject, and noted that choosing an abstract concept first and trying to construct a narrative based on it was "a lousy way to go about writing a story"). Another early story, "Under the Rose" (1961), includes among its cast of characters a cyborg set anachronistically in Victorian-era Egypt (a type of writing now called steampunk). This story, significantly reworked by Pynchon, appears as Chapter 3 of V. "The Secret Integration" (1964), Pynchon's last published short story, is a sensitively handled coming-of-age tale in which a group of young boys face the consequences of the American policy of racial integration. At one point in the story, the boys attempt to understand the new policy by way of the mathematical operation, the only sense of the word with which they are familiar.

The Crying of Lot 49 also alludes to entropy and communication theory, and contains scenes and descriptions which parody or appropriate calculus, Zeno's paradoxes, and the thought experiment known as Maxwell's demon. At the same time, the novel also investigates homosexuality, celibacy and both medically sanctioned and illicit psychedelic drug use. Gravity's Rainbow describes many varieties of sexual fetishism (including sado-masochism, coprophilia and a borderline case of tentacle erotica), and features numerous episodes of drug use, most notably cannabis but also cocaine, naturally occurring hallucinogens, and the mushroom Amanita muscaria. Gravity's Rainbow also derives much from Pynchon's background in mathematics: at one point, the geometry of garter belts is compared with that of cathedral spires, both described as mathematical singularities. Mason & Dixon explores the scientific, theological, and socio-cultural foundations of the Age of Reason while also depicting the relationships between actual historical figures and fictional characters in intricate detail and, like Gravity's Rainbow, is an archetypal example of the genre of historiographic metafiction.

Influence

Precursors
Pynchon's novels refer overtly to writers as disparate as Henry Adams (in V., p. 62), Jorge Luis Borges (in Gravity’s Rainbow, p. 264), Deleuze and Guattari (in Vineland, p. 97), Emily Dickinson (in Gravity’s Rainbow, pp. 27–8), Umberto Eco (in Mason & Dixon, p. 559), Ralph Waldo Emerson (in Vineland, p. 369), "Hopkins, T. S. Eliot, di Chirico’s novel Hebdomeros" (in V., p. 307), William March, Vladimir Nabokov (in The Crying of Lot 49, p. 120), Patrick O'Brian (in Mason & Dixon, p. 54), Ishmael Reed (in Gravity’s Rainbow, p. 558), Rainer Maria Rilke (in Gravity’s Rainbow, p. 97 f) and Ludwig Wittgenstein (in V., p. 278 f), and to a heady mixture of iconic religious and philosophical sources.

Critics have made comparisons of Pynchon's writing with works by Rabelais, Cervantes, Laurence Sterne, Edgar Allan Poe, Nathaniel Hawthorne, Herman Melville, Charles Dickens, Joseph Conrad, Thomas Mann, William S. Burroughs, Ralph Ellison, Patrick White, and Toni Morrison.

Pynchon's work also has similarities with writers in the modernist tradition who wrote long novels dealing with large metaphysical or political issues, such as Ulysses by James Joyce, A Passage to India by E. M. Forster, The Apes of God by Wyndham Lewis, The Man Without Qualities by Robert Musil and the U.S.A. trilogy by John Dos Passos. Pynchon explicitly acknowledges his debt to Beat Generation writers, and expresses his admiration for Jack Kerouac's On the Road in particular. He also outlines the specific influence on his own early fiction of literary works by T. S. Eliot, Ernest Hemingway, Henry Miller, Saul Bellow, Herbert Gold, Philip Roth, Norman Mailer, John Buchan and Graham Greene, and non-fiction works by Helen Waddell, Norbert Wiener and Isaac Asimov.

Legacy
Pynchon's work has been cited as an influence and inspiration by many writers, including David Foster Wallace, William Vollmann, Richard Powers, Steve Erickson, David Mitchell, Neal Stephenson, Dave Eggers, William Gibson, Salman Rushdie, Alan Moore, and Tommaso Pincio (whose pseudonym is an Italian rendering of Pynchon's name).

Thanks to his influence on Gibson and Stephenson in particular, Pynchon became one of the progenitors of cyberpunk fiction; a 1987 essay in Spin magazine by Timothy Leary explicitly named Gravity's Rainbow as the "Old Testament" of cyberpunk, with Gibson's Neuromancer and its sequels as the "New Testament". Though the term "cyberpunk" did not become prevalent until the early 1980s, since Leary's article many readers have retroactively included Gravity's Rainbow in the genre, along with other works—e.g., Samuel R. Delany's Dhalgren and many works of Philip K. Dick—which seem, after the fact, to anticipate cyberpunk styles and themes. The encyclopedic nature of Pynchon's novels also led to some attempts to link his work with the short-lived hypertext fiction movement of the 1990s.

The main-belt asteroid 152319 is named after Pynchon.

Media scrutiny of private life
Relatively little is known about Pynchon's private life; he has carefully avoided contact with reporters for more than fifty years. Only a few photos of him are known to exist, nearly all from his high school and college days, and his whereabouts have often remained undisclosed.

A 1963 review of V. in The New York Times Book Review described Pynchon as "a recluse" living in Mexico, thereby introducing the media label with which journalists have characterized him throughout his career. Nonetheless, Pynchon's personal absence from mass media is one of the notable features of his life, and it has generated many rumors and apocryphal anecdotes.

Pynchon wrote an introduction for his short story collection Slow Learner. His comments on the stories after reading them again for the first time in many years, and his recollection of the events surrounding their creation, amount to the author's only autobiographical comments to his readers.

1970s and 1980s
After the publication and success of Gravity's Rainbow, interest mounted in finding out more about the identity of the author. At the 1974 National Book Awards ceremony, the president of Viking Press, Tom Guinzberg, arranged for double-talking comedian "Professor" Irwin Corey to accept the prize on Pynchon's behalf. Many of the assembled guests had no idea who Corey was and had never seen the author, so they assumed it was Pynchon himself on the stage delivering Corey's trademark torrent of rambling, pseudo-scholarly verbiage. Toward the end of Corey's address a streaker ran through the hall, adding further to the confusion.

An article published in the SoHo Weekly News claimed that Pynchon was in fact J. D. Salinger. Pynchon's written response to this theory was simple: "Not bad. Keep trying."

Thereafter, the first piece to provide substantial information about Pynchon's personal life was a biographical account written by a former Cornell University friend, Jules Siegel, and published in Playboy magazine. In his article, Siegel reveals that Pynchon had a complex about his teeth and underwent extensive and painful reconstructive surgery, was nicknamed "Tom" at Cornell and attended Mass diligently, acted as best man at Siegel's wedding, and that he later also had an affair with Siegel's wife. Siegel recalls Pynchon saying he did attend some of Vladimir Nabokov's lectures at Cornell but that he could hardly make out what Nabokov was saying because of his thick Russian accent. Siegel also records Pynchon's commenting: "Every weirdo in the world is on my wavelength", an observation borne out by the crankiness and zealotry that has attached itself to his name and work in subsequent years.

1990s
Pynchon does not like to talk with reporters, and refuses the spectacle of celebrity and public appearances. Some readers and critics have suggested that there were and are perhaps aesthetic (and ideological) motivations behind his choice to remain aloof from public life. For example, the protagonist in Janette Turner Hospital's short story "For Mr. Voss or Occupant" (published in 1991), explains to her daughter that she is writing

More recently, book critic Arthur Salm has written that

Pynchon has published a number of articles and reviews in the mainstream American media, including words of support for Salman Rushdie and his then-wife, Marianne Wiggins, after the fatwa was pronounced against Rushdie by the Iranian leader, Ayatollah Ruhollah Khomeini. In the following year, Rushdie's enthusiastic review of Pynchon's Vineland prompted Pynchon to send him another message hinting that if Rushdie were ever in New York, the two should arrange a meeting. Eventually, the two did have dinner together. Rushdie later commented: "He was extremely Pynchon-esque. He was the Pynchon I wanted him to be".

In 1990, Pynchon married his literary agent, Melanie Jackson—a great-granddaughter of Theodore Roosevelt and a granddaughter of Robert H. Jackson, U.S. Supreme Court Justice and Nuremberg trials prosecutor—and fathered a son, Jackson, in 1991. The disclosure of Pynchon's 1990s location in New York City, after many years in which he was believed to be dividing his time between Mexico and northern California, led some journalists and photographers to try to track him down. Shortly before the publication of Mason & Dixon in 1997, a CNN camera crew filmed him in Manhattan. Angered by this invasion of his privacy, he called CNN asking that he not be identified in the footage of the street scenes near his home. When asked by CNN, Pynchon rejected their characterization of him as a recluse, remarking "My belief is that 'recluse' is a code word generated by journalists ... meaning, 'doesn't like to talk to reporters'." CNN also quoted him as saying, "Let me be unambiguous. I prefer not to be photographed." The next year, a reporter for the Sunday Times managed to snap a photo of him as he was walking with his son.

After several references to Pynchon's work and reputation were made on NBC's The John Larroquette Show, Pynchon (through his agent) reportedly contacted the series' producers to offer suggestions and corrections. When a local Pynchon sighting became a major plot point in a 1994 episode of the series, Pynchon was sent the script for his approval; as well as providing the title of a fictitious work to be used in one episode ("Pandemonium of the Sun"), the novelist apparently vetoed a final scene that called for an extra playing him to be filmed from behind, walking away from the shot. Pynchon also insisted that it should be specifically mentioned in the episode that Pynchon was seen wearing a T-shirt showing psychedelic-rock musician Roky Erickson. According to the Los Angeles Times, this spurred an increase in sales of Erickson's albums. Also during the 1990s, Pynchon befriended members of the band Lotion and contributed liner notes for the band's 1995 album Nobody's Cool. Although the band initially claimed that he had seen them in concert and become a groupie, in 2009 they revealed to The New Yorker that they met him through his accountant, who was drummer Rob Youngberg's mother; she gave him an advance copy of the album and he agreed to write the liner notes, only later seeing them in concert.  The novelist then conducted an interview with the band ("Lunch with Lotion") for Esquire in June 1996 in the lead-up to the publication of Mason & Dixon. More recently, Pynchon provided faxed answers to questions submitted by author David Hajdu and permitted excerpts from his personal correspondence to be quoted in Hajdu's 2001 book, Positively 4th Street: The Lives and Times of Joan Baez, Bob Dylan, Mimi Baez Fariña and Richard Fariña.

Pynchon's insistence on maintaining his personal privacy and on having his work speak for itself has resulted in a number of outlandish rumors and hoaxes over the years. Indeed, claims that Pynchon was the Unabomber or a sympathizer with the Waco Branch Davidians after the 1993 siege were upstaged in the mid-1990s by the invention of an elaborate rumor insinuating that Pynchon and one "Wanda Tinasky" were the same person. A collection of the Tinasky letters was eventually published as a paperback book in 1996; however, Pynchon himself denied having written the letters, and no direct attribution of the letters to Pynchon was ever made. "Literary detective" Donald Foster subsequently showed that the Letters were in fact written by an obscure Beat writer, Tom Hawkins, who had murdered his wife and then committed suicide in 1988. Foster's evidence was conclusive, including finding the typewriter on which the "Tinasky" letters had been written.

In 1998, over 120 letters that Pynchon had written to his longtime agent, Candida Donadio, were donated by the family of a private collector, Carter Burden, to the Pierpont Morgan Library in New York City. The letters ranged from 1963 to 1982, thus covering some of the author's most creative and prolific years. Although the Morgan Library originally intended to allow scholars to view the letters, at Pynchon's request the Burden family and Morgan Library agreed to seal these letters until after Pynchon's death.

2000s

Responding to the image which has been manufactured in the media over the years, Pynchon made two cameo animated appearances on the television series The Simpsons in 2004. The first occurs in the episode "Diatribe of a Mad Housewife", in which Marge Simpson becomes a novelist. He plays himself, with a paper bag over his head, and provides a blurb for the back cover of Marge's book, speaking in a broad Long Island accent: "Here's your quote: Thomas Pynchon loved this book, almost as much as he loves cameras!" He then starts yelling at passing cars: "Hey, over here, have your picture taken with a reclusive author! Today only, we'll throw in a free autograph! But, wait! There's more!" In his second appearance, in "All's Fair in Oven War", Pynchon's dialogue consists entirely of puns on his novel titles ("These wings are 'V'-licious! I'll put this recipe in 'The Gravity's Rainbow Cookbook', right next to 'The Frying of Latke 49'."). The cartoon representation of Pynchon reappears in a third, non-speaking cameo, as a guest at the fictional WordLoaf convention depicted in the 18th season episode "Moe'N'a Lisa". The episode first aired on November 19, 2006, the Sunday before Pynchon's sixth novel, Against the Day, was released.  According to Al Jean on the 15th season DVD episode commentary, Pynchon wanted to do the series because his son was a big fan.

During pre-production of "All's Fair in Oven War", Pynchon faxed one page from the script to producer Matt Selman with several handwritten edits to his lines. Of particular emphasis was Pynchon's outright refusal to utter the line "No wonder Homer is such a fat-ass." Pynchon's objection apparently had nothing to do with the salty language as he explained in a footnote to the edit, "... Homer is my role model and I can't speak ill of him."

In celebration of the 100th anniversary of George Orwell's birth, Pynchon wrote a new foreword to Orwell's celebrated dystopian novel Nineteen Eighty-Four. The introduction presents a brief biography of Orwell as well as a reflection on some of the critical responses to Nineteen Eighty-Four. Pynchon also offers his own reflection in the introduction that "what is perhaps [most] important, indeed necessary, to a working prophet, is to be able to see deeper than most of us into the human soul."

In July 2006, Amazon.com created a page showing an upcoming 992-page, untitled, Thomas Pynchon novel. A description of the soon-to-be published novel appeared on Amazon purporting to be written by Pynchon himself. The description was taken down, prompting speculation over its authenticity, but the blurb was soon back up along with the title of Pynchon's new novel Against the Day.

Shortly before Against the Day was published, Pynchon's prose appeared in the program for "The Daily Show: Ten Fu@#ing Years (The Concert)", a retrospective on Jon Stewart's comedy-news broadcast The Daily Show.

On December 6, 2006, Pynchon joined a campaign by many other major authors to clear Ian McEwan of plagiarism charges by sending a typewritten letter to his British publisher, which was published in the Daily Telegraph newspaper.

Pynchon's 2009 YouTube promotional teaser for the novel Inherent Vice is the second time a recording of his voice has been released to mainstream outlets (the first being his appearances on The Simpsons).

2010s
In 2012, Pynchon's novels were released in e-book format, ending a long holdout by the author. Publisher Penguin Press reported that the novels' length and complex page layouts made it a challenge to convert them to a digital format. Though they had produced a promotional video for the June release, Penguin had no expectation Pynchon's public profile would change in any fashion.

In 2013, his son, Jackson Pynchon, graduated from Columbia University, where he was affiliated with St. Anthony Hall.

In September 2014, Josh Brolin told The New York Times that Pynchon had made a cameo in the Inherent Vice film adaptation. This led to a sizable online hunt for the author's appearance, eventually targeting actor Charley Morgan, whose small role as a doctor led many to believe he was Pynchon. Morgan, son of M*A*S*Hs Harry Morgan, claimed that Paul Thomas Anderson, whom he described as a friend, had told him that such a cameo did not exist. Despite this, nothing has been directly confirmed by Anderson or Warner Bros. Pictures.

On November 6, 2018, Pynchon was photographed near his apartment in New York's Upper West Side district when he went to vote with his son. The photo was published by the National Enquirer and was said to be the first photo of him "in decades".

2020s
In December 2022, the Huntington Library announced that it had acquired the literary archive, including typescripts and drafts of each of Pynchon's novels, handwritten notes, correspondence with publishers, and research.

Works

 V. (1963)
 The Crying of Lot 49 (1966)
 Gravity's Rainbow (1973)
 Slow Learner (1984), collection of previously published short stories
 Vineland (1990)
 Mason & Dixon (1997)
 Against the Day (2006)
 Inherent Vice (2009)
 Bleeding Edge (2013)

See also 

 Postmodern literature
 Hysterical realism

References

Further reading
 Kharpertian, Theodore D. Thomas Pynchon and Postmodern American Satire pp. 20–2, in Kharpertian A Hand to Turn the Time: The Menippean Satires of Thomas Pynchon.
 McHale, Brian (1981), Thomas Pychon: A Portrait of the Artist as a Missing Person. Cencrastus No. 5 (Summer 1981), pp. 2 – 7, 
 Stevenson, Randall (1983). Review of The Small Rain. Cencrastus, No. 11 (New Year 1983), pp. 40 & 41,

External links

The following links were last verified on May 31, 2017.

 Inherent Vice Diagrammed A reader's guide to Pynchon's novel Inherent Vice, with diagrams showing all the character relationships, a character-relationship index, and chapter and plot summaries.
 
 
 Thomas Pynchon – ThomasPynchon.com
 The Thomas Pynchon Wiki
 Pynchon Notes, a journal operated from 1979 and 2009 by the Miami University in Oxford, Ohio, archived by the Open Library of Humanities.
 Pynchon in Public Podcast, a podcast going through each of Pynchon's novels, one episode at a time.
 

 
1937 births
20th-century American novelists
21st-century American novelists
American historical novelists
American male novelists
American tax resisters
Cornell University alumni
Living people
American Roman Catholics
MacArthur Fellows
National Book Award winners
Postmodern literature
Postmodern writers
Writers from Glen Cove, New York
United States Navy sailors
Novelists from New York (state)
American male essayists
21st-century American essayists
Catholics from New York (state)
Roosevelt family
20th-century American male writers
21st-century American male writers